The 2013 Girabola was the 35th season of top-tier football in Angola. The season ran from 26 February to 3 November 2013. Recreativo do Libolo were the defending champions. Kabuscorp were crowned champions having won their first title.

The league comprised 16 teams and the bottom three were relegated to the 2014 Segundona.

The winner and the runner-up qualified to the CAF Champions League.

Changes from 2012 season
Relegated: Académica do Soyo, Sporting de Cabinda, Nacional de Benguela 
Promoted: Desportivo da Huíla, Porcelana FC, Primeiro de Maio

League table

Results

Season statistics

Top scorers

See also
 2013 Angola Cup
 2014 Angola Super Cup

References

External links
Federação Angolana de Futebol
Girabola 2013 stats at jornaldosdesportos.sapo.ao

Girabola seasons
1
Angola
Angola